Dritte (meaning "third" in the German language) may refer to:
The Third (film) (original title Der Dritte), 1971 German film
Dritte Wahl,  a German Punk rock group from Rostock in the former East Germany

See also